Jesse Petrea (born June 24, 1966) is an American politician who has served in the Georgia House of Representatives from the 166th district since 2015. He is a member of the Republican Party.

References

1966 births
Living people
Politicians from Savannah, Georgia
21st-century American politicians
Republican Party members of the Georgia House of Representatives